The Port of Las Khorey, also known as the Las Khorey Port, is the official functioning seaport of Las Khorey, situated in Somalia

Overview
In 2012, Faisal Hawar, CEO of the Maakhir Resource Company, brokered an agreement with a Greek investment firm for the development of the commercial Las Khorey Port. A team of engineers was subsequently enlisted by the Puntland authorities to assess the ongoing renovations taking place at the seaport. According to the Minister of Ports, Saeed Mohamed Ragge, the Puntland government intends to launch more such development projects in Las Khorey.

References

Sanaag
Geography of Somaliland